Attacks were carried out by various armed groups in the Democratic Republic of the Congo in 2021 and 2022. The attacks have killed 629 and injured 321 (not including rebel casualties). At least 82 perpetrators were also killed and one injured in these attacks.

Throughout the conflict, rebel troops have carried out raids and massacres across the DRC, resulting in heavy civilian casualties. In October 2021, the ADF launched a bombing campaign in Uganda, leading to the intervention of the Ugandan military the year later, which has pursued a policy of airstrikes against ADF targets. In contrast, the Islamic State has reportedly lent support to the Allied Democratic Forces.

The government under Félix Tshisekedi has tried to combat the insurgency by declaring martial law, with mixed success.

Humanitarian situation 
Ongoing conflict in the country has led to a humanitarian crisis, with hundreds of people killed by both sides. UN convoys have been raided, leading to the murder of Italian ambassador Luca Attanasio, possibly by the FDLR. The UNHCR has estimated that around 20,000 civilians have been displaced, often several times, during the attacks. Many refugee camps for these displaced people have been raided by rebels, prompting condemnation from the United Nations.

According to reporters, the ADF has used civilians as human shields, which is a war crime under international law.

Timeline

2021

2022

See also 
 2020 Democratic Republic of the Congo attacks
 2021 in the Democratic Republic of the Congo
 List of terrorist incidents in 2021
 List of terrorist incidents in 2022

References 

2020s conflicts
2022 fires in Africa
2021 fires in Africa
2021 in the Democratic Republic of the Congo
2021 attacks
2022 in the Democratic Republic of the Congo
21st-century mass murder in Africa
Allied Democratic Forces
April 2021 crimes in Africa
Arson in Africa
Arson in the 2020s
2021
Attacks on buildings and structures in 2021
Attacks on churches in Africa
Conflicts in 2022
Democratic Republic of the Congo–Uganda relations
February 2021 crimes in Africa
Ituri
January 2021 crimes in Africa
Kidnapping in Africa
Kidnapping in the 2020s
Lubumbashi
March 2021 crimes in Africa
Mass murder in 2021
Mass stabbings
May 2021 crimes in Africa
North Kivu
Stabbing attacks in 2021
2021 attacks
Wars involving Uganda